Jake L. Hamon Jr. (July 24, 1902 – 1985) was an American oilman and philanthropist.

Early life
Jake L. Hamon Jr. was born on July 24, 1902 in Lawton, Oklahoma. He was named after his father; his mother was Georgia Perkins. He spent his childhood in Ardmore, Oklahoma.

Hamon attended the University of Chicago for two years. He dropped out of college in 1920, when his father was shot to death.

Career and philanthropy 
Hamon started his career in Ranger, Texas in 1920 and drilled his own well a year later. He subsequently partnered with oilman Edwin B. Cox (Edwin L. Cox's father), and established a corporate office in Dallas, Texas in 1932. The two men worked together until 1950.

Hamon served on the board of directors of the American Petroleum Institute in 1934. He subsequently served as the president of the National Stripper Well Association, the Texas Mid-Continent Oil and Gas Association, and the Mid-Continent Oil and Gas Association. During World War II, he served as a member of the Petroleum Industry Council for National Defense. He was inducted in the Oklahoma Hall of Fame in 1968.

Hamon founded the Hamon Oil Company in 1984.

Hamon made charitable contributions to the Dallas Museum of Art, and he served on the board of trustees of the Dallas Zoological Society and Southern Methodist University. He was also on the board of the Cotton Bowl Athletic Association.

Personal life
Hamon married Nancy Blackburn on March 28, 1949. They had two sons and a daughter. Hamon was a personal friend of former US President George H. W. Bush. Hamon and his wife visited the Bushes in China when Bush served as Envoy to China in March 1975.

Hamon died in 1985 while he was on vacation in Amsterdam.

References

1902 births
1985 deaths
People from Lawton, Oklahoma
People from Dallas
University of Chicago alumni
Businesspeople from Oklahoma
Businesspeople from Texas
American businesspeople in the oil industry
20th-century American businesspeople